Jon Michael Reichenbach (born September 14, 1961, in Fort Meade, Maryland) is a former American football linebacker who played eight seasons in the National Football League, mainly with the Philadelphia Eagles.

References

1961 births
Living people
American football linebackers
Philadelphia Eagles players
Miami Dolphins players
East Stroudsburg Warriors football players
People from Fort Meade, Maryland